Thomas Johansson (born 1975) is a Swedish tennis player and coach.

Thomas Johansson is also the name of:

 Thomas Johansson (footballer, born 1961), Swedish football forward for AIK
 Thomas Johansson (footballer, born 1966), Swedish footballer for Djurgården
 Thomas Johansson (Malmö FF footballer) (born 1961), Swedish footballer active 1991
 Thomas Johansson (ice hockey) (born 1970), Swedish ice hockey player

See also
 Thomas Johanson (born 1969), Finnish sailor and Olympic champion
 Tomas Johansson (disambiguation)
 Tommy Johansson (disambiguation)